Sri Lohit High School is an educational institute in the lower part of Majuli, (Namoni Majuli) Jorhat, Assam, India. It is said to have been named after the Lohit River, a tributary to the Brahmaputra River. It has both the high (from class VIII to class X) and Middle English (from class V to class VII) section. The Sri Lohit High School and Sri Lohit Middle English School are on the same campus with a single school building.

History
The school was established in 1952 under the name Sri Lohit Middle English School with Headteacher Nandi Das. The founder Headteacher of the M.E. School section was Jogen Dutta.

Campus
There is a playground in front of the school building where outdoor games are held. The campus is surrounded by paddy fields on three sides. A vocational school is on the campus.

The campus is used almost every year to hold Bihu Xonmilon (stage bihu competition) and Bohagi bidai (farewell to bohag month or rongali bihu) during the Rongali Bihu by the local cultural committees.

Academic instruction

Subjects and medium
The medium of teaching is Assamese, but students can take classes in English also. The following subjects are there for the high and M.E. section. 
 Assamese
 English
 Hindi
 Mathematics
 General Science
 Social studies
 History
 Geography
 Drawing
 Handicraft

Hindi, History, and Geography are Elective Subjects and students have to opt for any one of them.

Academic session
The academic session starts from January to December. After the completion of six months a 'Half Yearly Examination' is conducted. Then in the end of the year the Annual Examination is commenced. Every class teacher takes a 'Unit Test' on their subject throughout the year.

Summer classes
This is an initiative taken by the regional AASU committee to offer free coaching classes to the students during the summer vacation period. Students from other schools of the locality can join these summer classes.

Spiritual instruction
The classes start from 10:00am. Before that is Morning Prayer. The students get together in a line in the front field or veranda and offer their prayer. The teachers join them. Then they go to their classrooms.

Student life
The Union is the general body of the students of the school. The union functions in accordance with its constitution. Office bearers of the Union Executives are elected annually and they function under the guidance of a teacher-in-charge appointed by the Principal. One student in every class is appointed 'Class Captain' to look after the class in the absence of class teacher. The 10th standard students get exemption from taking part in the union due to their preparation for matriculation.

Uniform
For boys, the uniform is navy blue trousers and sky blue shirts. For girls, in the M.E. section, it is navy blue skirts and sky blue tops and in the high section mekhela chador (mekhela being white and chador being white with navy blue edge). Students wear a school-badge.

Events
Annual events celebrated by the school include Republic Day, Independence Day, Teachers' Day, Saraswati pooja, the eve of the summer vacation and other regional/national festivals.

During the annual sports week students play cricket, football, volleyball, kabaddi, running, relay race, shot put, javelin, discus, long jump, high jump, triple jump, Ludo, chess, carrom, musical chairs, skipping, debate, oratory, creative writing, poetry recitation, music and drama.

At the end of the week is prize-giving day. From every class, one student is awarded as the 'Best Student of the Year' depending on their academic/discipline/attendance performance.

The farewell of the 10th standard students is a special occasion. After being passed out in the test examination, which is so crucial being a qualifying exam to matriculation, the students get together in the school for the last time.

See also
List of educational institutes in Majuli
List of villages in Majuli

External links
Assam General Knowledge, Page 52

Educational institutions established in 1964
High schools and secondary schools in Assam
Majuli
1964 establishments in Assam